Labipur (a village) is a Tharu village located in the Itahari sub-metropolitan city of Sunsari District in the Koshi Zone of south-eastern Nepal.

Labipur was previously included in the village development committee known as Hansposha.

References

External links
 Website

Populated places in Sunsari District